Kekilli is a Turkish surname. Notable people with the surname include:

 Sibel Kekilli (born 1980), German actress
 Umut Kekıllı (born 1984), German-Turkish footballer

Turkish-language surnames